SACO (Saudi Company for Hardware) is a provider of home improvement products in Saudi Arabia. Founded in 1984, SACO started out with one store in Riyadh. Over the next two decades, the company expanded its reach across the country and, to date, operates 34 stores in 18 cities, including five stores (known as SACO World), each occupying between 2,350 and 24,500 square meters.

History
SACO was established in Riyadh in 1984 by a small group of entrepreneurs. Two decades later, in May 2004, the company set out to open SACO World in Riyadh, the largest, first-of-its-kind store in the Middle East. In June 2010, the company built its second SACO World in the Red Sea port city of Jeddah, and a year after that opened its largest superstore yet in the eastern province of Dhahran.

In 2015, it became a publicly listed company. In 2018, SACO opened its 31st store and, today, it has 34 stores across the country, with plans in the works to build more stores in the coming years.

SACO acquired Medscan Terminal, a Saudi-based logistics service provider, in 2016. Amongst its latest endeavours are the launch of its new website and an e-commerce app.

Board of Directors
SACO is led by CEO Haytham Al Hamidi, alongside the executive management team and board of directors. The board includes: Abdulrahman Jawa (Chairman), Khalid Mohammed Abdulaziz Al Hamidi (Non-Executive), Sameer Mohammed Abdulaziz Al Hamidi (Executive), Haytham Mohammed Abdulaziz Al Hamidi (Executive), Bandar Khalid Ibrahim Al-Turki (Non-Executive), Ahmed Mohammed Salem Al Sari (Deputy Chairman – Independent), Talal Mohammed Baksh (Non-Executive), Sameer Omar Baeisa (Independent), and Fahed Malaeka (Independent).

Products and Services
- SACO carries a wide range of products that fall under seven departments: Tools and Hardware, Outdoor and Garden, Home Essentials, Home Improvement, Automotive, Electronics, and Sports, Fitness, and Toys.

- SACO also offers three main areas of services: Delivery and Assembly, Installation, and Item Warranty and Maintenance.

References

Hardware stores
Retail companies of Saudi Arabia
Wholesalers of Saudi Arabia
Retail companies established in 1985
Companies based in Riyadh
Companies of Saudi Arabia
Saudi Arabian companies established in 1985